James Chatham Duane (June 10, 1824 – December 8, 1897) was a career officer in the Union Army during the American Civil War, being the Chief Engineer of the Army of the Potomac.

Early life
Duane was born on June 10, 1824 in Schenectady, New York to James Duane and Harriet Constable. His paternal grandparents were James Chatham Duane (1769–1842) and Mary Ann Bowers (1773–1828). His great-grandfather James Duane (1733–1797) was a member of the Continental Congress and mayor of New York City. Duane graduated from Union College in 1844, where he was a founding member of Chi Psi fraternity, and from the United States Military Academy in 1848, where he ranked third in his class.

Career
He taught practical military engineering there from 1852–54 during the superintendency of Robert E. Lee. Serving with the Army's company of sappers, miners, and pontoniers for nine years before the American Civil War, he led the engineers on a 1,100-mile march on the Utah Expedition in 1858 and commanded select engineer troops to guard President Abraham Lincoln at his inauguration in 1861.

Duane built the first military pontoon bridge over the Potomac River at the Battle of Harpers Ferry in 1862, served as Chief Engineer of the Army of the Potomac from 1863–65, and in seven hours in 1864 built the longest pontoon bridge of the Civil War (2,170 ft) across the James River.

On April 10, 1866, President Andrew Johnson nominated Duane for appointment to the grade of brevet brigadier general in the Regular Army (United States), to rank from March 13, 1865, and the United States Senate confirmed the appointment on May 4, 1866.

Duane commanded at Willets Point, New York, from 1866–1868, and for ten years constructed fortifications along the coasts of Maine and New Hampshire. He was appointed lieutenant colonel in the U.S. Army to rank from March 7, 1867 and colonel in the U.S. Army, January 10, 1883. He was president of the Board of Engineers from 1884-1886. Appointed Chief of Engineers and brigadier general on October 11, 1886, he retired June 30 1888. He then became Commissioner of Croton Aqueduct in New York City. He published a paper on the "History of the Bridge Equipage in the United States Army."

Personal life
He married Harriet Whitehorne Brewerton (1830-1914) in 1850. Together, they had:
James Duane (1852–1899)
Charles Duane (1856-?)
Alexander Duane (1858-1926)

General Duane died in New York City, November 8, 1897. He was buried in Vale Cemetery, Schenectady, New York.

See also

List of American Civil War brevet generals (Union)

References
Notes

Sources
This article contains public domain text from 

United States Military Academy alumni
Union Army officers
1824 births
1897 deaths
Military personnel from Schenectady, New York
Union College (New York) alumni
People of New York (state) in the American Civil War
Chi Psi founders
Duane family